Ohoden Col (‘Ohodenska Sedlovina’ \'o-ho-den-ska se-dlo-vi-'na\) is the ice-covered col of elevation 1000 m extending 950 m on Trinity Peninsula in Graham Land, Antarctica, which is linking Ivory Pinnacles to the north to Detroit Plateau to the south.  It is surmounting Pettus Glacier to the east.

The col is named after the settlement of Ohoden in Northwestern Bulgaria.

Location
German-British mapping in 1996.

Maps
 Trinity Peninsula. Scale 1:250000 topographic map No. 5697. Institut für Angewandte Geodäsie and British Antarctic Survey, 1996.
 Antarctic Digital Database (ADD). Scale 1:250000 topographic map of Antarctica. Scientific Committee on Antarctic Research (SCAR). Since 1993, regularly updated.

Notes

References
 Ohoden Col. SCAR Composite Antarctic Gazetteer
 Bulgarian Antarctic Gazetteer. Antarctic Place-names Commission. (details in Bulgarian, basic data in English)

External links
 Ohoden Col. Copernix satellite image

Mountain passes of Trinity Peninsula
Bulgaria and the Antarctic